Jirakit Thawornwong (also known as Mek, born 28 August 1994) is a Thai actor and singer. He is known for his main roles as View in GMMTV's Room Alone 401-410 (2014) and Room Alone 2 (2015), as Zero in Ugly Duckling Series: Don't (2015) and as Hawk in U-Prince Series (2016–2017).

Early life and education 
Jirakit was born in Bangkok, Thailand. In 2017, he graduated with a bachelor's degree in communication arts from the Faculty of Humanities at Kasetsart University.

Career 
With a desire to become a singer, Jirakit participated in the 7th season of The Star, a reality television singing competition, representing Central Thailand but did not make it to the Top 24. He auditioned again for its 8th season, this time representing Southern Thailand, and still got eliminated. He was later offered and signed up by GMM Grammy as one of its artists. He started in the entertainment industry as a host of Bang Music Buffet in 2011 and was tapped to play the role of Pete in the movie Part Time Lover (2014).

He also played main and support roles in Ugly Duckling (2015), Kiss: The Series (2016), U-Prince Series (2016–2017), and Secret Seven (2017).

Filmography

Film

Television

Personal life 
Jirakit is the older brother of actress and singer Worranit Thawornwong. His father died on 21 August 2019.

References

External links 
 
 
https://instagram.com/jirakitth_c

1994 births
Living people
Jirakit Thawornwong
Jirakit Thawornwong
Jirakit Thawornwong
Jirakit Thawornwong
Jirakit Thawornwong
Jirakit Thawornwong